Boyko is a masculine given name which is borne by:

 Boyko Aleksiev (born 1963), Bulgarian former figure skater
 Boyko Borisov (born 1959), Bulgarian politician, former Prime Minister of Bulgaria
 Boyko Kamenov (born 1975), Bulgarian football manager and former player
 Boyko Vasilev (born 1970), Bulgarian journalist and television producer and presenter
 Boyko Velichkov (born 1974), Bulgarian football manager and former player

Bulgarian masculine given names